Yogeeta Bali Chakraborty (born 13 August 1952) is a former Indian Bollywood actress. She was active in the late 1970s and through the 1980s.

Biography 
Yogeeta Bali was born on 13 August 1952. She is the niece of actress Geeta Bali. 

Bali married Kishore Kumar in 1976 and divorced him in 1978. She then married Mithun Chakraborty in 1979. They have three sons-Mahaakshay, Ushmey, Namashi and a daughter-Dishani. Mahaakshay,  "Mimoh" is an actor, while Namashi is going to debut in the film Bad Boy.

Filmography

References

External links 
 

1952 births
Living people
Indian film actresses
Actresses in Hindi cinema
Actresses from Kolkata
20th-century Indian actresses